The Rocky Mountain Cup is a soccer trophy contested between Real Salt Lake and the Colorado Rapids. The cup is awarded by the Committee of 10, a group of bi-partisan fans who run the competition, to the team with the most points in games played between the two. The teams are awarded 3 points for each win and 1 point for each tie in regular season MLS games against each other. The Cup is awarded at the conclusion of the deciding game of the series between the two teams.

If the teams end the season in a points tie, the team with the most goals on aggregate will win (for a two-team competition, this is equivalent to goal differential). If the teams are tied on aggregate goals, the current holders retain the Cup for another year.

The cup was created in 2005, the first year of play for Real Salt Lake.

History
When it was officially announced that Salt Lake City would be awarded an MLS expansion club, fans from Utah and Colorado founded the bi-partisan Committee of 10 (5 supporters from each club) and began to outline the official rules of the competition. The contest was named the Rocky Mountain Cup after a vote from the fans, and a trophy was acquired.

The Rocky Mountain Cup began on April 16, 2005 at Real Salt Lake's inaugural home game, in which Real earned their first-ever win with a 1–0 victory. Colorado eventually won the trophy in 2005 after besting Real in the three subsequent matches that season, officially clinching the Cup at their final meeting of the year at Rice-Eccles Stadium.

Prior to the 2006 MLS season, the two clubs swapped players in a trade, exchanging forward Jeff Cunningham and midfielder Clint Mathis. The repercussions of the trade surfaced in an August 10 match in which RSL humiliated Colorado 4–1 at INVESCO Field, punctuated by a stellar performance by Cunningham in which he earned two goals and an assist.

The Rapids would have their revenge later that year during a very heated match in Salt Lake City on September 2. The affair saw numerous hard fouls and seven yellow cards. Fans showered the field with debris and missiles throughout the game. Colorado would grind out a 1–0 victory and secure the Rocky Mountain Cup for the second consecutive year. A myriad of controversy erupted after the game as the Rapids celebrated with the trophy. Rapids captain Pablo Mastroeni removed his shirt, stuffed it down his shorts, and began making gestures at the Salt Lake fans. RSL owner Dave Checketts then came on to the field and confronted Mastroeni in an angry verbal exchange which was later broken up by players and officials. Much to the ire of Real fans, the League did not take action for Mastroeni's controversial behavior.

The 2007 competition kicked off with the Rapids earning a comfortable 2–0 win on the road. After the match, Colorado midfielder Kyle Beckerman made remarks towards RSL supporters and their reaction towards the controversy of the previous September: "It definitely comes from their fans. They run their mouths the whole game. If they don't want us to celebrate, win the game."

The next meeting between the teams, a 1-1 draw on May 10, finished with a bizarre distinction of being the only draw in MLS history in which only own goals were scored. Later that year, on July 16, the two clubs exchanged Kyle Beckerman and Mehdi Ballouchy. This trade proved particularly controversial for Rapids supports and further deteriorated their relationship with Colorado head coach Fernando Clavijo.

Real Salt Lake would then even the 2007 series in September, forcing the deciding match in Colorado a month later on the final game of the season. Both teams were all but mathematically ruled out of the MLS Cup Playoffs, leaving the October 20 contest largely a match for pride. The Rapids needed only a draw to secure the cup for a third year, but Real grabbed a late win when Robbie Findley scored in the 87th minute. The victory for Real Salt Lake won the club their first Rocky Mountain Cup, and also brought a painful end to one of Colorado's worst-ever seasons.

2008 would play out in similar fashion to the previous year. The deciding match was again at Dick's Sporting Goods Park on the final day of the season. However, the stakes were higher, with a win for either side guaranteeing a playoff spot along with the Rocky Mountain Cup (Real could also prevail with a draw). Colorado pulled ahead and held a 1–0 lead into the closing seconds of the game, but Yura Movsisyan scored a clutch stoppage-time goal to end the game with a 1–1 draw. The result was quite possibly RSL's greatest moment in club history: retaining the Cup for a second year, clinching their first-ever postseason berth, and denying Rapids of the playoffs on their own turf. Salt Lake fans celebrated by throwing a number of smoke bombs onto the pitch after the final whistle, adding insult to injury for the stunned Colorado supporters.

The 2010 edition of the Rocky Mountain Cup played out as close and exciting as the previous three seasons. In the first leg, held September 27 at RSL's Rio Tinto Stadium, Real Salt Lake fielded a squad of mostly reserves in the middle of a busy stretch of their schedule including 2010–11 CONCACAF Champions League group stage matches. Coach Jason Kreis rested most of the starters in anticipation of an opportunity to clinch a berth in the CCL knockout round three days later. Conor Casey gave Colorado a 1–0 lead in the 36th minute. The result looked like it would hold until former Rapids defender Nat Borchers headed in a service from Andy Williams in the 93rd minute for the 1–1 draw. The second leg would finish in an even more exciting fashion. The teams returned to Dick's Sporting Goods Park for the final match of the regular season on October 23. Both teams had already clinched playoff spots. RSL needed a win or tie to have a chance at winning the Supporters' Shield. Colorado appeared to dash those hopes with a 16th-minute goal by Omar Cummings and a 51st-minute header by Conor Casey. Rapids fans were ready to celebrate their first Rocky Mountain Cup in 4 years while carrying a 2–0 lead into stoppage time. RSL forward Alvaro Saborio scored twice in stoppage time – first on a blocked clearance from Colorado keeper Matt Pickens in the 91st minute, and second on a penalty in the 95th minute after Drew Moor pulled RSL defender Jamison Olave down in the box on an RSL free kick. The resulting 2–2 draw gave RSL the Rocky Mountain Cup for the 4th consecutive season due to being the previous year's winner. Conditions after the match became ugly when several RSL players made obscene gestures towards the Colorado supporters' terrace and were consequently showered with beer cups and other projectiles. The draw would prove to be beneficial for Colorado, as it put them in the easier Eastern Conference bracket for the 2010 MLS Cup Playoffs in which Colorado won its first ever MLS Cup.

Winners
Tiebreakers: 1. goal differential; 2. away goals (prior to 2008, when teams played an equal number of home games; never used); 3. holders retain cup.

Series results

League matches 

 The MLS is Back Tournament game was announced as not being part of the competition by the Committee of 10, the competition organizers.

Playoff matches 

The two sides have yet to meet in the MLS Cup Playoffs

Open Cup matches

Continental matches 

The two sides have yet to meet in the CONCACAF Champions League or Leagues Cup

Friendly matches

Statistics

Regular season

 Only MLS regular season matches played between Colorado Rapids and Real Salt Lake counted towards records.
 Own goals not counted
 If players are tied for a stat, the player who has most recently accomplished the stat is listed first.

Crossing the Continental Divide

As of 2017, nine players have played for both teams in the Rocky Mountain Cup. This was notably started by a trade between the two teams in 2007, in which Colorado's Kyle Beckerman was traded to Salt Lake for Mehdi Ballouchy, both of whom became regular contributors for their new clubs.  The trade also corresponded with Salt Lake's control of the Rocky Mountain Cup for many years.  In addition, Nat Borchers, Jeff Cunningham, Atiba Harris, Richie Kotschau, Clint Mathis, Collen Warner, Chris Wingert, and Luis Gil have also faced off on both sides of the rivalry.

As of 12 September 2020

The Committee of 10
The Committee of 10, or C10, was initially formed through discussions between fans from both Real Salt Lake and the Colorado Rapids on BigSoccer.com and on the now defunct fan forums at RealSaltLake.org. It was decided that each team's fans would be represented by five individuals per side. These representatives would be responsible for creating the guidelines, design, and ultimately raising the funds to create the Rocky Mountain Cup.

The Original Committee of 10

 = Original Chairman

Sources 

Real Salt Lake
Colorado Rapids
Major League Soccer rivalries
Soccer cup competitions in the United States
Recurring sporting events established in 2005
2005 establishments in Colorado
2005 establishments in Utah